Worsham may refer to:

 Worsham, Oxfordshire, England
 Worsham, Virginia, US
 Worsham (surname)